Kirkbampton  a civil parish in the Borough of Allerdale in Cumbria, England.  It contains nine listed buildings that are recorded in the National Heritage List for England.  Of these, one is listed at Grade I, the highest of the three grades, and the others are at Grade II, the lowest grade.  The parish contains the settlements of Kirkbampton, Little Bampton, and Oughterby, and is otherwise rural.  The listed buildings consist of a 12th-century church, houses, farmhouses, farm buildings, and a war memorial.


Key

Buildings

References

Citations

Sources

Lists of listed buildings in Cumbria